Rajvardhan Hangargekar (born 10 November 2002) is an Indian cricketer. He made his Twenty20 debut on 16 January 2021, for Maharashtra in the 2020–21 Syed Mushtaq Ali Trophy. He made his List A debut on 21 February 2021, for Maharashtra in the 2020–21 Vijay Hazare Trophy. In December 2021, he was named in India's team for the 2022 ICC Under-19 Cricket World Cup in the West Indies.

In February 2022, he was bought by the Chennai Super Kings in the auction for the 2022 Indian Premier League tournament.

References

External links
 

2002 births
Living people
Indian cricketers
Maharashtra cricketers
Place of birth missing (living people)